The Abbott Independent School District is a school district based in Abbott, Texas, United States.

Finances
As of the 2010-2011 school year, the appraised valuation of property in the district was $48,305,000. The maintenance tax rate was $0.111 and the bond tax rate was $0.028 per $100 of appraised valuation.

Academic achievement
In 2011, the school district was rated "recognized" by the Texas Education Agency.  Thirty-five percent of districts in Texas in 2011 received the same rating. No state accountability ratings will be given to districts in 2012. A school district in Texas can receive one of four possible rankings from the Texas Education Agency: Exemplary (the highest possible ranking), Recognized, Academically Acceptable, and Academically Unacceptable (the lowest possible ranking).

Historical TEA accountability ratings 
2011: Recognized
2010: Exemplary
2009: Exemplary
2008: Recognized
2007: Recognized
2006: Recognized
2005: Recognized
2004: Recognized

Schools
In the 2011-2012 school year, the district had students in two schools.
Regular instructional
Abbott High School (Grades Pre-K-12)
JJAEP instructional
Hill County JJAEP (Grades 6-12)

Special programs

Athletics
Abbott High School participates in the boys sports of baseball, basketball, and football The school participates in the girls sports of basketball, volleyball and softball. For the 2012 through 2014 school years, Abbott High School will play six-man football in UIL Class 1A 6-man Football Division I.

See also

List of school districts in Texas
List of high schools in Texas

References

External links
Abbott Independent School District

School districts in Hill County, Texas